SKOAR! is an Indian magazine, website, and community dedicated to video games. It is a part of 9.9 Mediaworx and was started in 2003 as a bi-monthly publication by Jasubhai Digital Media (JDM) Pvt. Ltd.

History and profile
SKOAR! was launched in 2003 as a sister publication to Digit in order to cater to more hardcore gamers. The tagline of SKOAR! was "... when it's done".

SKOAR!'''s tagline was changed to "India's only gaming magazine" as of 2010 (which may or may not be true as a statement in itself). Publishing of SKOAR! as a magazine was stopped in 2011, and it was made into a gaming section inside its sister publication Digit and an occasional supplement in some of Digit's special issues. In 2014 SKOAR! was relaunched as a digital e-magazine that was given away with every issue of  Digit in the form of a SKOAR! DVD. The e-magazine was an interactive PDF that was provided on the DVD, which also contains other gaming software such as full games, game demos, videos that are of interest to gamers, wallpapers, and more.SKOAR! was re-instated as a print supplement with  Digit  in November 2014, and continues to this day (as of their April 2015 issue). The SKOAR! website was relaunched on 4 April 2015, and apart from PC and console gaming, also covers mobile gaming extensively.

SectionsSKOAR!' features "sections dealing with PC as well as console games. The games are rated on the basis of visual appeal, sound, gameplay and mojo factor and employ a horizontal bar with a maximum rating of 10.

ExpoSKOAR!'' has been arranging gaming expos in metropolitans of India. On 30 January  2008 it has conducted 4 expos. The first expo was held in Mumbai, the second one in Bangalore and a third one was held in January 2007 in Delhi.

The fourth expo was conducted in Mumbai at MMRDA grounds, Bandra Kurla Complex for spend three days (25 to 27 January 2008).

References

External links
 Official website

2003 establishments in India
9.9 Media Products
English-language magazines published in India
English-language video game magazines
Computer magazines published in India
Magazines established in 2003
Bi-monthly magazines published in India